Gilles LePage is a Canadian politician, who was elected to the Legislative Assembly of New Brunswick in the 2014 provincial election. He represents the electoral district of Restigouche West as a member of the Liberal Party.

LePage was named Vice Chairman of the Select Committee on Cannabis, pursuant to Motion 31 of the 3rd session of the 58th New Brunswick Legislature. He was a Minister in the Gallant administration.

On September 24, 2018, LePage was voted in again to be the MLA for the riding of Restigouche West. He was re-elected in the 2020 provincial election.

Electoral record

Restigouche West

References

Living people
Members of the Executive Council of New Brunswick
New Brunswick Liberal Association MLAs
People from Restigouche County, New Brunswick
21st-century Canadian politicians
Year of birth missing (living people)